The Statute Law Revision Act 1948 is an Act of the Parliament of the United Kingdom.

Section 5(3) of the Statute Law Revision Act 1950 provided that this Act, so far as it repealed chapter 34 of the Statute of Westminster 1285 (13 Edw. 1 St. 1 c. 34), was to be deemed not to have extended to Northern Ireland.

Section 1: Enactments in schedule repealed
This section provided, amongst other things, that the enactments described in Schedule 1 to this Act were repealed, subject to the provisions of this Act and subject to the exceptions and qualifications in that Schedule.

This section was repealed by Group 1 of Part XVI of Schedule 1 to the Statute Law (Repeals) Act 1993.

The enactments which were repealed (whether for the whole or any part of the United Kingdom) by this Act were repealed so far as they extended to the Isle of Man on 25 July 1991.

Section 2: Application of repealed enactments in local courts
The words "to the court of the county palatine of Lancaster or" in this section were repealed by section 56(4) of, and Part II of Schedule 11 to, the Courts Act 1971. This section was repealed by section 32(4) of, and Part V of Schedule 5 to, the Administration of Justice Act 1977.

Section 3: Omissions
Sections 3(1)(c) to (f) were repealed by Group 1 of Part XVI of Schedule 1 the Statute Law (Repeals) Act 1993.

In a report dated 6 April 1993, the Law Commission and the Scottish Law Commission said that sections 3(1)(c) to (f) and 4 "provided in general terms for the repeal of or omission of various recurrent words relating to obsolete civil procedure (which occurred mainly in now obsolete statutory provisions for the recovery of penalties by common informers), to Scottish stewartries (which occurred mainly in obsolete definitions of "sheriff" or "county") and to self-governing Dominions of the Old Commonwealth". The provision relating to Scottish stewartries had been intended to give effect to section 7 of the Interpretation Act 1889 which had been repealed as obsolete by the Interpretation Act 1978. They said that the "utility of these provisions proved to be marginal and in practice they were little used" and that they were "spent or unnecessary now".

Section 4: General repeal of obsolete or unnecessary words
This section repealed
(a) words barring the allowance in any action or proceeding of any essoin or privilege or protection or wager of law or imparlance or of bail or mainprise or benefit of clergy; and
(b) the words “that part of Britain called” or “that part of the United Kingdom called,” or words to the like effect, where used before the words “England”, “Scotland” or “Ireland.”

It was repealed by Group 1 of Part XVI of Schedule 1 the Statute Law (Repeals) Act 1993.

Section 5: Citation of Acts
Section 5 and Schedule 2 authorised the citation of 158 earlier Acts by short titles. The Acts to which short titles were given were passed between 1236 and 1860.

In 1995, the Law Commission and the Scottish Law Commission recommended that section 5 and Schedule 2 be repealed.

Section 5 and Schedule 2 were repealed by section 1(1) of, and Part IV of Schedule 1 to, the Statute Law (Repeals) Act 1995.

Section 6: Short title and extent
Section 6(2) was repealed by section 41(1) of, and Part I of Schedule 6 to, the Northern Ireland Constitution Act 1973.

Schedule 1
This Schedule was repealed by section 1 of, and Schedule 1 to, the Statute Law Revision Act 1950.

See also
Statute Law Revision Act

References
Halsbury's Statutes. Fourth Edition. 2008 Reissue. Volume 41. Page 755.
The Public General Acts and the Church Assembly Measures of 1948. HMSO. 1948. Volume II.
HL Deb vol 155, cols 1135 to 1136, vol 156, cols 756 to 761, 926 to 927 and 1083 to 1084, vol 157, cols 14  , 179, 380, 576 and 1272, HC Deb vol 450, col 197W, vol 452, col 879 to 880, vol 453, cols 1650 to 1659.

External links

United Kingdom Acts of Parliament 1948